The Beatbox was an Irish music programme, broadcast as a simulcast across both television (RTÉ Two) and radio (RTÉ 2fm) between the hours of 11.30 and 1.30 on Sunday mornings / afternoons. It ran from the late 1980s until 1995, and had a number of different presenters through the years, including Barry Lang, Simon Young, Peter Collins and Ian Dempsey. It was a forerunner of the similar 2TV, hosted by Dave Fanning.

1980s in Irish music
1990s in Irish music
Irish music television shows
RTÉ 2fm programmes
RTÉ original programming
Irish music radio programs